The A55 autoroute is a free motorway in southern France.

The road starts at Marseille at La Joliette and ends to the west of Martigues where it becomes the N568 towards Arles and Nîmes.

Exit list

01 (Vieux-Port) Towns served: Vieux-Port
02 (Port) Towns served: Port with regular Ferry services to Corsica and Algeria
03 Exchange A55-A557 Junction with the A557 to the A7 and Aix-en-Provence
04 (La Madrague) La Madrague
05 (L'Estaque/Le Rove) Towns served: L'Estaque, Le Rove
06 (L'Estaque-Nord) Towns served: L'Estaque, Saint-Antoine
Junction A7-A55 Junction with the A7
 Service Area: Rebuty/La Nerthe
07 (Marignan) Towns served: Marignane, Gignac-la-Nerthe, Le Rove
08 (Ensuès-la-Redonne) Towns served: Ensuès-la-Redonne, Carry-le-Rouet, Sausset-les-Pins
09 (La Mède-Est) Towns served: La Mède,  Châteauneuf-les-Martigues
10 (La Mède-Est) Towns served: La Mède
11 (Martigues-Est) Towns served: Martigues
12 (Martigues-Sus) Towns served: Martigues, Lavéra
13 (Martiques) Towns served: Martigues D5 towards Saint-Mitre-les-Remparts and Istres
End of autoroute which merges into the N568 towards Arles, Nîmes and Montpellier.

History
The first section was opened in 1972. The last section was completed connecting this junction to the Vieux-Port of Marseille in 1989.

Future
This motorway will be extended towards Arles by upgrading the N568 over the Plaine de la Crau. No date has been scheduled as yet, only a by-pass for Port-de-Bouc which is currently being evaluated.

External links

 A55 Motorway in Saratlas

A55
Streets in Marseille